The Pandesmini are a tribe of moths in the family Erebidae.

Genera

Pandesma
Polydesma

References

 
Erebinae
Moth tribes